The Little Gangster (Dutch: De Boskampi's) is a 2015 Dutch film directed by Arne Toonen and Arent Jack.

The film is based on the book De Boskampi's, een legendarische maffiafamilie by Marjon Hoffman.

Awards 

The film won the Best Dutch Family Film at the 2015 Cinekid Festival, both the jury prize and the audience prize. The film won the Michel Award at the 2015 Filmfest Hamburg as well as the audience award at the Seoul International Youth Film Festival. The film also won the jury award at Oulu International Children's and Youth Film Festival.

Cast 

 Thor Braun as Rikkie
 Henry van Loon as Paul
 Meral Polat as Gina
 René van 't Hof as Fred
 Rick Lens as Roderick
 Thijn Brobbel as Noah
 Noël Keulen as Anton
 Ellen Pieters as Riet
 Loes Haverkort as Wanda
 Lineke Rijxman as Gerda
 Luciano Hiwat as Davie
 Dylan Pijper as Jaap
 Joes Brauers as Menno
 Sep Tamminga as Dirk
 Joop Kasteel as Gio
 Fedja van Huêt as Marco SR
 Maas Bronkhuyzen as Marco JR
 Teun Luijkx as Gymleraar nieuwe school
 Raymond Thiry as Commandant Cornelissen
 Horace Cohen as  Rechercheur

References

External links 
 

2015 films
Dutch crime comedy films
2010s Dutch-language films
Films directed by Arne Toonen